

From 4,000 to 4,999 

 4000 Hipparchus
 4001 Ptolemaeus
 
 4003 Schumann
 
 
 
 4007 Euryalos
 4008 Corbin
 4009 Drobyshevskij
 
 
 
 
 
 4015 Wilson-Harrington
 
 
 
 
 
 
 4022 Nonna
 
 
 
 
 
 
 4029 Bridges
 
 4031 Mueller
 
 
 4034 Vishnu
 4035 Thestor
 
 
 
 
 
 
 
 
 
 4045 Lowengrub
 
 
 
 
 
 
 
 
 
 4055 Magellan
 
 4057 Demophon
 
 
 4060 Deipylos
 
 
 4063 Euforbo
 
 4065 Meinel
 
 
 4068 Menestheus
 
 
 
 
 
 
 
 
 
 
 
 
 
 4082 Swann
 
 
 4085 Weir
 4086 Podalirius
 
 
 
 4090 Říšehvězd
 
 
 
 
 
 
 
 
 
 
 
 
 
 
 
 
 
 
 
 
 
 
 
 
 
 
 
 4118 Sveta
 
 
 
 
 
 
 
 
 
 
 
 
 
 
 
 
 
 
 
 4138 Kalchas
 
 
 
 4142 Dersu-Uzala
 
 
 
 
 4147 Lennon
 
 4149 Harrison
 4150 Starr
 4151 Alanhale
 
 
 
 
 
 
 
 
 
 
 
 
 
 
 
 
 
 
 
 
 
 
 
 4175 Billbaum
 4176 Sudek
 4177 Kohman
 
 4179 Toutatis
 
 
 
 4183 Cuno
 
 4185 Phystech
 
 
 
 
 
 
 
 
 
 
 
 4197 Morpheus
 
 
 
 
 
 
 
 4205 David Hughes
 
 
 
 4209 Briggs
 
 
 
 
 
 
 
 4217 Engelhardt
 
 
 
 
 4222 Nancita
 
 
 
 
 
 
 
 4230 van den Bergh
 
 
 
 
 
 
 
 
 
 
 
 
 
 
 
 
 
 
 
 
 
 
 
 
 
 
 4257 Ubasti
 
 
 
 
 
 4263 Abashiri
 
 4265 Kani
 
 
 
 
 
 
 
 
 
 
 4276 Clifford
 
 
 
 
 
 4282 Endate
 
 
 
 
 
 
 
 
 
 
 
 
 
 
 
 
 
 
 
 
 
 
 
 
 
 
 
 
 
 
 
 
 
 
 
 4318 Baťa
 
 
 
 
 
 4324 Bickel
 
 
 
 
 
 
 
 4332 Milton
 
 
 
 
 4337 Arecibo
 
 
 4340 Dence
 4341 Poseidon
 
 
 
 
 
 
 4348 Poulydamas
 4349 Tibúrcio
 
 
 
 
 4354 Euclides
 
 
 
 4358 Lynn
 
 
 
 4362 Carlisle
 
 4364 Shkodrov
 
 
 
 
 
 
 
 
 
 
 
 
 
 
 
 
 
 
 4383 Suruga
 
 
 
 
 4388 Jürgenstock
 
 
 4391 Balodis
 
 
 
 
 
 
 
 
 
 4401 Aditi
 
 
 
 
 
 
 
 
 
 
 
 
 
 
 
 
 
 
 
 
 
 
 
 
 
 
 
 4429 Chinmoy
 
 
 4432 McGraw-Hill
 
 
 4435 Holt
 
 
 
 
 4440 Tchantchès
 
 
 
 
 
 4446 Carolyn
 
 
 
 4450 Pan
 4451 Grieve
 
 
 
 
 
 
 
 
 
 
 
 
 
 
 
 
 
 
 
 
 
 
 
 
 
 
 
 
 
 
 
 
 
 
 4486 Mithra
 
 
 4489 Dracius
 
 
 4492 Debussy
 
 
 
 
 
 
 
 
 4501 Eurypylos
 
 
 
 
 
 
 
 
 
 
 
 
 
 
 
 
 
 
 
 
 
 
 4524 Barklajdetolli
 4525 Johnbauer
 
 
 
 
 
 
 
 
 
 
 
 
 
 
 
 
 
 4543 Phoinix
 4544 Xanthus
 
 
 4547 Massachusetts
 
 
 
 
 
 
 
 
 
 
 
 
 
 
 
 
 
 
 
 
 
 
 
 
 
 
 
 
 
 
 
 
 
 4581 Asclepius
 
 
 
 4585 Ainonai
 
 4587 Rees
 
 
 
 
 
 
 
 
 
 
 
 
 
 
 
 
 
 4606 Saheki
 4607 Seilandfarm
 4608 Wodehouse
 
 
 
 
 
 
 
 
 
 
 
 
 
 
 
 
 
 
 
 
 
 
 
 
 
 
 
 
 
 
 
 
 
 
 
 
 
 
 4647 Syuji
 
 
 
 
 
 
 
 
 
 
 
 4659 Roddenberry
 4660 Nereus
 
 
 
 
 
 
 
 
 
 
 
 4672 Takuboku
 
 4674 Pauling
 
 
 
 
 
 
 
 
 
 
 
 
 
 
 
 
 
 
 
 
 
 
 
 
 
 
 
 
 
 
 
 4707 Khryses
 4708 Polydoros
 4709 Ennomos
 
 
 
 4713 Steel
 
 4715 Medesicaste
 
 
 
 
 
 
 4722 Agelaos
 
 
 
 
 
 
 
 
 
 
 
 
 
 
 
 
 
 
 
 
 
 
 
 
 
 
 
 
 
 
 
 4754 Panthoos
 
 4756 Asaramas
 
 
 
 4760 Jia-xiang
 
 
 
 
 4765 Wasserburg
 
 
 
 4769 Castalia
 
 
 
 
 
 
 4776 Luyi
 
 
 
 
 
 
 
 
 
 4786 Tatianina
 
 
 4789 Sprattia
 4790 Petrpravec
 4791 Iphidamas
 4792 Lykaon
 
 
 
 
 4797 Ako
 
 
 
 
 
 
 4804 Pasteur
 4805 Asteropaios
 
 
 
 
 
 
 
 
 
 
 
 
 
 
 
 
 4822 Karge
 
 
 
 
 4827 Dares
 4828 Misenus
 
 
 
 4832 Palinurus
 4833 Meges
 4834 Thoas
 
 4836 Medon
 
 
 
 
 
 
 
 
 
 
 
 
 
 
 
 
 
 
 
 
 
 
 
 
 
 
 
 
 
 
 4867 Polites
 4868 Knushevia
 
 
 
 
 
 
 
 
 
 
 
 
 
 
 
 
 
 
 
 
 
 
 
 
 
 
 
 
 4897 Tomhamilton
 
 4899 Candace
 
 
 4902 Thessandrus
 
 4904 Makio
 
 
 
 
 
 
 
 
 
 
 
 
 
 
 
 
 
 
 4923 Clarke
 
 
 
 
 
 
 
 
 
 
 
 
 4936 Butakov
 
 
 
 
 
 4942 Munroe
 
 4944 Kozlovskij
 
 4946 Askalaphus
 4947 Ninkasi
 
 4949 Akasofu
 
 4951 Iwamoto
 
 4954 Eric
 
 
 4957 Brucemurray
 
 4959 Niinoama
 
 
 4962 Vecherka
 
 
 
 
 
 
 
 
 
 
 
 
 
 
 
 
 
 
 
 
 
 
 
 
 
 
 
 
 
 
 
 
 
 
 4997 Ksana

See also 
 List of minor planet discoverers
 List of observatory codes

References

External links 
 Discovery Circumstances: Numbered Minor Planets, Minor Planet Center

Lists of minor planets by name